Fussballclub Schötz is a football club from Schötz, Switzerland.

The club, founded in 1927, is currently playing in the Swiss 1. Liga.

Current squad
As of 1 November, 2021.

External links
 Official site

Football clubs in Switzerland
Association football clubs established in 1927
1927 establishments in Switzerland